The Sanibel 18 is an American trailerable sailboat, that was designed by Charles Ludwig, first built in 1982 and named for the Floridian town and island.

The boat was built by a series of different builders under several different model names in the United States, but all are now out of production.

Design

The series are all small recreational keelboats, built predominantly of fiberglass, with wood trim. They have fractional sloop rigs, transom-hung rudders and retractable centerboards. They are normally fitted with a small  outboard motor for docking and maneuvering.

The design has sleeping accommodation for three people, with a double "V"-berth in the bow and a straight settee in the main cabin.

Variants
Skipper's Mate 17
This model was introduced in 1982 and was built by Southern Sails until 1984.

Commodore 17
This model was introduced in 1984 and was built by the Commodore Yacht Corporation until 1985.

Sanibel 17 and 18
The Sanibel 17 was introduced in 1985 and was built by Captiva Yachts and later by International Marine. It was renamed the Sanibel 18 in 1986, although initially no changes were made to the design. A total of 169 examples were completed between 1985 and 1988.

Snug Harbor 18
This model was introduced in 1990 and was built by Leisure-Time Fiberglass Products, although very few were built. The molds were made by using an existing Sanibel 18 boat hull as a fiberglass mold plug.

See also
List of sailing boat types

Similar sailboats
Buccaneer 200
Catalina 18
COM-PAC 19
Com-Pac Sunday Cat
Cornish Shrimper 19
Drascombe Lugger
Hunter 19-1
Hunter 19 (Europa)
Mercury 18
Naiad 18
Nordica 16
Sandpiper 565
Santana 20
Siren 17
Typhoon 18
West Wight Potter 19

References

External links

Keelboats
1980s sailboat type designs
Sailing yachts
Trailer sailers
Sailboat type designs by Charles Ludwig
Sailboat types built by Southern Sails
Sailboat types built by Commodore Yacht Corporation
Sailboat types built by International Marine
Sailboat types built by Captiva Yachts
Sailboat types built by Leisure-Time Fiberglass Products
Sailboat types built by Sovereign Yachts